Francisco Lorenzo (born 22 March 1960) is a Spanish judoka. He competed in the men's half-lightweight event at the 1992 Summer Olympics.

References

1960 births
Living people
Spanish male judoka
Olympic judoka of Spain
Judoka at the 1992 Summer Olympics
Sportspeople from Madrid
Mediterranean Games bronze medalists for Spain
Mediterranean Games medalists in judo
Competitors at the 1993 Mediterranean Games
20th-century Spanish people
21st-century Spanish people